Så ska det låta is a Swedish game show, based on the Irish The Lyrics Board. The show was introduced in 1997 and led by Peter Harryson until Peter Settman took over in 2006. In 2014, Kalle Moraeus became the third host of the show. In 2018, Sarah Dawn Finer became the fourth host of the program and the first female host of the show.

References

External links

Sveriges Television original programming
Swedish game shows
1997 Swedish television series debuts